Union City School District or Union City Public Schools or Union City Board of Education may mean:

 Randolph Eastern School Corporation, in Union City,  Wayne Township, Randolph County, Indiana
 Union City Community Schools (Michigan), in Union City, Branch County, Michigan
 Union City School District (New Jersey), in Union City, New Jersey
 Union City School District (Oklahoma), in Union City, Canadian County, Oklahoma
 Union City Area School District, in Union City, Erie County, Pennsylvania
 Union City Schools (Tennessee), in Union City, Obion County, Tennessee

See also 
 Union School District (disambiguation)